Charles B. K. Beachcroft (born Charles Beachcroft Kay, 1870 – 1 July 1928) was the captain of the tournament winning Devon and Somerset Wanderers cricket team that represented Great Britain at the 1900 Summer Olympics, the only time cricket has been an Olympic sport.

Personal life
Beachcroft was the son of a vicar, John Lowder Kay. He was born in Rickmansworth, Hertfordshire. His father died in 1877 and Charles and his mother moved to Devon. He grew up to become a county level player in rugby, hockey and cricket, introduced the game of ping-pong to the county, and also competed in shooting. He played as opening bat for Exeter and various other local cricket teams, including Starcross. He married a local girl in 1889 and had four children before being arrested for abduction of a 17-year-old girl and living in London under the name of Charles Beachy Kay Beachcroft. The following year he married this girl, returned to Devon and took on the license of the Royal Hotel, Dawlish, under the name of C. B. Kay Beachcroft.

In the 1901 census his occupation is listed as a licensed victualler. His biography (One of Life's Great Charmers: A Biography of Charles Kay) shows that he was later declared bankrupt. In 1905, under the name of Charles Kay, he joined the stage and became a variety artist, humorist, comedian, actor, pantomime villain and touring theatre company manager, touring Stoll Moss theatres throughout England and Scotland over 16 years with different stage assistants/partners (Sybil Franklin, Lola Trent and Sadie Logan) and fathering a total of 13 children. He emigrated to Australia in 1921 and toured theatres in Australia and New Zealand until his death in Melbourne in 1928.

Athletic career

In the only match of the Olympics against France, he scored 23 runs in the first innings and 54 in the second.

References

External links

Olympic Final scorecard
Profiles of the British players at the 1900 Olympics

Further reading
 Michael Fairley, One of Life's Great Charmers: A Biography of Charles Kay (2015)

English cricketers of 1890 to 1918
English Olympic medallists
Olympic cricketers of Great Britain
Cricketers at the 1900 Summer Olympics
Olympic gold medallists for Great Britain
People from Rickmansworth
1870 births
1928 deaths
Medalists at the 1900 Summer Olympics
English emigrants to Australia
Music hall performers
Date of birth missing